Megasis rippertella is a species of snout moth. It is found in Spain, France, Switzerland, Austria, Italy, Bosnia and Herzegovina, North Macedonia, Greece, Bulgaria, Romania, Ukraine, Russia and Turkey.

The wingspan is about 35 mm.

References

Moths described in 1839
Phycitini
Moths of Europe
Moths of Asia